"Who You Say I Am" is a song performed by Australian praise and worship group Hillsong Worship. Written by Reuben Morgan and Ben Fielding, a studio-recorded version of the song was released on 15 June 2018 as the first single from their 26th live album, There Is More (2018), by Hillsong Music Australia and Capitol Christian Music Group. It appeared on the compilation album Wow Hits 2019.

It was nominated for Top Christian Song at the 2019 Billboard Music Awards.

Background
On 2 March 2018, Hillsong Worship released the live version of "Who You Say I Am" as one of two tracks available during the digital pre-order period for There Is More (2018), the live album slated for an April release. On 6 April 2018, a live acoustic version of the song was released as a bonus track on the digital edition of There Is More. Following the album's release, Hillsong Worship released Spotify Singles, which has two songs, including "Who You Say I Am" which was recorded at Sound Stage in Nashville, Tennessee, on 2 May 2018. Hillsong Worship then released a studio version of "Who You Say I Am" in digital formats on 15 June 2018 as a single. The studio version of the song impacted Australian radio on 22 June 2018. On 13 July 2018, Hillsong Worship published the studio sessions version of the song which released as a song in There Is More: Studio Sessions EP. On 19 October 2018, Hillsong Worship released an instrumental version of "Who You Say I Am" in the instrumental album titled There Is More: Instrumental.

Music videos
Hillsong Worship published a live music video of "Who You Say I Am" recorded during the 2018 Hillsong Worship & Creative Conference held at Hillsong Church in Sydney, Australia, on 2 March 2018 via the video-sharing website, YouTube. On 6 March 2018, the acoustic performance video of the song was published on Hillsong Worship's YouTube channel. Hillsong Worship then published the official lyric video of the song's live version on 21 March 2018. On 13 July 2018, Hillsong Worship published the studio version of the song which released as a song in ''There Is More: Studio Sessions.

Awards and nominations

Track listing

Charts

Weekly charts

Year-end charts

Decade-end charts

Certifications

Release history

References

External links
 

2017 songs
2018 singles
Hillsong Worship songs
Songs written by Reuben Morgan